Colwood may refer to:

Canada
 Colwood, British Columbia

United Kingdom
 Colwood, Cornwall
 Colwood, West Sussex

United States
 Colwood, Michigan